The Iraq disarmament crisis was claimed as one of primary issues that led to the multinational invasion of Iraq on 20 March 2003. Since the 1980s, Iraq was widely assumed to have been producing and extensively running the programs of biological, chemical and nuclear weapons. Iraq made extensive use of chemical weapons during the Iran–Iraq War in the 1980s, including against its own Kurdish population. France and the Soviet Union assisted Iraq in the development of its nuclear program, but its primary facility was destroyed by Israel in 1981 in a surprise air strike.

After the Gulf War in 1990, the United Nations located and destroyed large quantities of Iraqi chemical weapons and related equipment and materials with varying degrees of Iraqi cooperation and obstruction, but the Iraqi cooperation later diminished in 1998. The disarmament issue remained tense throughout the 1990s with U.S. at the UN, repeatedly demanding Iraq to allow inspections teams to its facilities. These crises reached their climax in 2002-2003, when U.S. President George W. Bush demanded a complete end to what he alleged was Iraqi production of weapons of mass destruction, and reasoned with Iraqi President Saddam Hussein to comply with UN Resolutions requiring UN weapons inspectors unfettered access to areas those inspectors thought might have weapons production facilities.

Since the Gulf War in 1991, Iraq had been restricted by the United Nations (UN) from developing or possessing such weapons. It was also required to permit inspections to confirm Iraqi compliance. Bush repeatedly backed demands for unfettered inspection and disarmament with threats of invasion. On 20 March 2003, a multinational alliance containing the armed forces of the United States and United Kingdom launched an invasion of Iraq in 2003. After the withdrawal of U.S. troops from Iraq in 2011, a number of failed Iraqi peace initiatives were revealed.

Background
In the decade following the 1991 Gulf War, the United Nations passed 16 Security Council resolutions calling for the complete elimination of Iraqi weapons of mass destruction. Member states communicated their frustration over the years that Iraq was impeding the work of the special commission and failing to take seriously its disarmament obligations. Iraqi security forces had on several occasions physically prevented weapons inspectors from doing their job and in at least one case, took documents away from them.

On 29 September 1998, the United States Congress passed the Iraq Liberation Act supporting the efforts of Iraqi opposition groups to remove Saddam Hussein from office. The Act was signed by President Clinton on 31 October 1998. On the same day, Iraq announced it would no longer cooperate with United Nations weapons inspectors.

The UN, under Kofi Annan, brokered a deal wherein Iraq would allow weapons inspectors back into the country. Iraq ceased cooperating with inspectors only days later. The inspectors left the country in December. Inspectors returned the following year as part of The United Nations Monitoring, Verification and Inspection Commission (UNMOVIC).

Paul Wolfowitz, the military analyst for the United States Department of Defense under Ronald Reagan, had formulated a new foreign policy with regard to Iraq and other "potential aggressor states", dismissing "containment" in favor of "preemption", with the goal of striking first to eliminate threats.

This policy was short-lived, however, and Clinton, along with George H. W. Bush, Colin Powell, and other former Bush administration officials, dismissed calls for preemption in favor of continued containment. This was the policy of George W. Bush as well for his first several months in office. The September 11, 2001 attacks brought to life Wolfowitz's and other "hawks'" advocacy for preemptive action; Iraq was widely agreed to be a likely subject of this new policy. Powell continued to support the philosophy behind containment.

Following the Gulf War, the Iraqi Army was reduced to 23 divisions with a total of about 375,000 troops. The Iraqi Air Force was reduced to less than 300 aircraft. The Iraqi Navy was almost completely destroyed, and its few remaining operational vessels were in a poor state of repair, the crews were estimated to be in a poor state of readiness, and its capabilities were reduced to that of limited mining and raiding missions. Any rebuilding that was done went into the Republican Guard, and the formation of the Special Republican Guard.

2002–2003

During late 2002 and into 2003, the United States government continued to call for "regime change" in Iraq and threatened to use military force to overthrow the Iraqi government unless Iraq rid itself of all weapons of mass destruction (WMD) it supposedly possessed and convinced the UN that it had done so.

US diplomatic pressure to bring Iraq to compliance quickly created a diplomatic crisis in the UN, where some members were in agreement with the U.S. position, while others dissented, notably the permanent Security Council members France, Russia and the People's Republic of China, and fellow NATO members Germany and Belgium.

The Bush administration began a military buildup in the region, and after pushing hard gained passage of UN Security Council Resolution 1441. Led by Hans Blix, Head of the United Nations Monitoring, Verification and Inspection Commission (UNMOVIC) and Mohamed ElBaradei Director General of the International Atomic Energy Agency (IAEA), the Resolution brought weapons inspectors back to Iraq in November 2002.

Inspectors began visiting sites where WMD production was suspected, but found no evidence of such activities, except for 18 undeclared empty 122 mm chemical rockets that were destroyed under UNMOVIC supervision. P. 30 Inspectors also found that the Al-Samoud-2 and Al-fatah missiles violated the UN range restrictions, the former also being partially destroyed under UNMOVIC supervision.

On March 7, 2003 Hans Blix reported accelerated cooperation throughout the month of February but it was still not "immediate" and "unconditional" as called for by UN Security Council Resolution 1441. He informed the UN security council that "it will not take years, nor weeks, but months" to verify whether Iraq had complied with its disarmament obligations.

U.S. President George W. Bush and British Prime Minister Tony Blair met in the Azores islands for an "emergency summit" over the weekend of March 15–16, 2003, after which Bush declared that, despite Blix's report, "diplomacy had failed" to compel Iraq to comply with UN Resolution inspection requirements, and stated his intention to use military force to attack Iraq in what was, according to the Bush administration, compliance with the threat of "serious consequences" in UN 1441.

UNSC disagreement

Several close allies of the U.S. (e.g. Germany, Belgium and France) opposed a military intervention because they asserted it would increase rather than decrease the risk of terrorist attacks. Although the British government and some governments of other members of the EU and NATO supported the US position, opinion polls show that in general their populations were against an attack, especially an attack without clear UN Security Council support. Millions of people in the major cities of Europe, and hundreds of thousands in major cities of North America, participated in peace marches on 15 February 2003.

Statements by President Bush
On 7 October 2002 President Bush stated:
Eleven years ago, as a condition for ending the Persian Gulf War, the Iraqi regime was required to destroy its weapons of mass destruction, to cease all development of such weapons, and to stop all support for terrorist groups. The Iraqi regime has violated all of those obligations. It possesses and produces chemical and biological weapons. It is seeking nuclear weapons. It has given shelter and support to terrorism, and practices terror against its own people. The entire world has witnessed Iraq's eleven-year history of defiance, deception and bad faith.

On 17 March 2003 Bush stated in an address to the nation:

Intelligence gathered by this and other governments leaves no doubt that the Iraq regime continues to possess and conceal some of the most lethal weapons ever devised. This regime has already used weapons of mass destruction against Iraq's neighbors and against Iraq's people.

Two days later on March 19, 2003, as the invasion of Iraq began, Bush stated in an address to the nation:

"My fellow citizens, at this hour, American and coalition forces are in the early stages of military operations to disarm Iraq, to free its people and to defend the world from grave danger.

Statement by Russian President Vladimir Putin
On October 11, 2002, Russian President Vladimir Putin met with then British Prime Minister Tony Blair. At a news conference, he said:

 Russia does not have in its possession any trustworthy data that supports the existence of nuclear weapons or any weapons of mass destruction in Iraq and we have not received any such information from our partners as yet.

Statements by French President Jacques Chirac
In a February 2003 joint declaration by Russia, Germany and France, Jacques Chirac remarked:

 As far as France is concerned, we are ready to envisage everything that can be done under UNSCR 1441. ... But I repeat that every possibility offered by the present resolution must be explored, that there are a lot of them and they still leave us with a lot of leeway when it comes to ways of achieving the objective of eliminating any weapons of mass destruction which may exist in Iraq. I'd like nevertheless to note that, as things stand at the moment, I have, to my knowledge, no indisputable proof in this sphere.

Legality

Authority under International Law
The position of whether the invasion was legal under international law is unclear. Article 2 of the United Nations Charter forbids UN members from employing "the threat or use of force" against other states in a manner inconsistent with the purposes of the United Nations. Two exceptions exist to the rule: self-defense (Article 51) or an authorization by the Security Council to protect international peace and security (Chapter VII).

The government of the United States said publicly, and the British pledged privately, that they were willing to invade Iraq with or without Security Council authorization.

There have been two military actions carried out with the approval of the Security Council. These two instances were the Korean War and the 1991 Gulf War.

The United States does not recognize the jurisdiction of any international court over its citizens or military, holding that the United States Supreme Court is its final authority. One example of this policy is that the United States did not ratify the International Criminal Court (ICC) treaty, and on 6 May 2002 it informed the UN that it has no intention to do so.

As of 24 February 2005 neither Iraq nor the United States have ratified the ICC treaty, and therefore neither the US attack on Iraq nor subsequent actions in Iraq fall under the jurisdiction of the ICC. The actions of signatories such as the United Kingdom and Spain could however fall under the ICC jurisdiction.

On March 17, 2003, Peter Goldsmith, Attorney General for England and Wales, set out his government's legal justification for an invasion of Iraq. He said that the 1990 Security Council Resolution 678 authorised force against Iraq, which was suspended but not terminated by the 1991 Resolution 687, which imposed continuing obligations on Iraq to eliminate its weapons of mass destruction. A material breach of resolution 687 would revive the authority to use force under resolution 678. In Resolution 1441 the Security Council determined that Iraq was in material breach of resolution 687 because it had not fully carried out its obligations to disarm, and in early 2003 sent teams of weapons inspectors to verify the facts on the ground.

Most member governments of the United Nations Security Council made clear that in their view, after resolution 1441 there was still no authorization for the use of force and that the invasion was illegal under international law. However, the US and its allies argued that no resolution authorizing the invasion would be necessary as they acted in self-defense under Article 51 of the UN Charter and by customary international law. The exercise of that right could not be banned by ceasefire. Since Iraq was not actively disarming themselves of its alleged WMDs and hid them from UN inspectors, the US and its allies claimed they had the right to assume that Iraq was holding WMDs. If the UN failed to force compliance, the US and the UK - as parties of the 1991 conflict - would invade Iraq without the UN, as they had already done in their intervention in the Kosovo War. Yoram Dinstein equates this to police officers cornering a convicted violent felon and saying "put your hands on your head", but instead he pulls something small and black (whether a gun or not) out of his pocket. Officers would have been justified in shooting him because he could have possessed something that is dangerous.

Authority under US Constitution
The Constitution grants the power to declare war exclusively to the United States Congress, but declares the President to be Commander-in-Chief of the US military. Because of this division of power, there has long been controversy regarding the authority of the President outside of a declared war. Nonetheless, of the many instances the United States has exercised force outside its borders, only five have been as part of a declared war.

In 1973, amid increasing domestic controversy about the Vietnam War, Congress passed the War Powers Resolution to limit the ability of the president to undertake prolonged military action without Congressional authority. No president since has recognized the constitutionality of this act, and most legal scholars believe it would not survive a challenge in court.

To avoid initiating a crisis under the War Powers Resolution, the Bush administration sought explicit approval from the Congress to exercise force in Iraq. On October 9, 2002, the Congress passed the Iraq Resolution which explicitly authorized the President to use the Armed Forces of the United States as he determines to be necessary and appropriate. This raises the issue of whether or not Congress has the authority to delegate legislative power to the executive branch.  However, in a recent United States Supreme Court case, Hamdan v. Rumsfeld, the Supreme Court ruled that the military commissions that the President had established, (and defended by arguing that he was given the power to create military courts by this resolution), were unconstitutional because they were unauthorized by Congress.

The Constitution also provides that international treaties ratified by the United States are among the highest law of the land (US Constitution, Article VI). The UN Charter is a treaty ratified by the US, which forbids member states, including the US, from attacking fellow member states, including Iraq, except in two carefully circumscribed situations (see UN Charter).

Aftermath
After the invasion of Iraq, the Iraq Survey Group, headed by David Kay was formed to find the alleged weapons of mass destruction. Apart from a small quantity of degraded pre-1991 shells, nothing was found.

See also

 United Nations actions regarding Iraq
 Iraq disarmament crisis timeline 1990-1996, 1997-2000, 2001-2003
 Blair's tests for Iraq Disarmament
 Curveball (informant) - False informant about weapons of mass destruction in Iraq
 Support and opposition for the U.S. plan to invade Iraq
 Disarmament of Libya

References

External links
 UK Attorney General's Iraq response - BBC News
 Blair - "We are ready to act on Iraq" - BBC News
 Bully Bush - Slate Magazine
 Some Evidence on Iraq Called Fake - Washington Post
 Iraq's Weapons of Mass Destruction: A Net Assessment - International Institute for Strategic Studies
 News & Analysis: Iraq - World Socialist Web Site
 Rice makes case against Iraq to Britain -  Washington Times
 The Thirty Year Itch  - Mother Jones
 When Will Americans Come? - Wall Street Journal
  Who Armed Iraq? - San Francisco Chronicle
 Examines Reasons for War - American Liberty Foundation
 Law unto themselves - Guardian

Iraq and weapons of mass destruction
History of the foreign relations of the United States
Iraq–United States relations
Iraq–United Kingdom relations
Military disbanding and disarmament